Routt County is a county located in the U.S. state of Colorado. As of the 2020 census, the population was 24,829. The county seat is Steamboat Springs. Routt County comprises the Steamboat Springs, CO Micropolitan Statistical Area.

History
Placer gold was found near Hahns Peak in 1864 as part of the Colorado Gold Rush.

Routt County was created out of the western portion of Grand County on January 29, 1877.  It was named in honor of John Long Routt, the last territorial and first state governor of Colorado.  The western portion of Routt County was split off to form Moffat County on February 27, 1911.

Geography

Adjacent counties
Carbon County, Wyoming - north
Jackson County - east
Grand County - southeast
Eagle County - south
Garfield County - south-southwest
Rio Blanco County - southwest
Moffat County - west

Major Highways
  U.S. Highway 40
  State Highway 131
  State Highway 134

National protected areas
Mount Zirkel Wilderness
Routt National Forest
Sarvis Creek Wilderness
White River National Forest

State protected areas
Pearl Lake State Park
Stagecoach State Park
Steamboat Lake State Park
Yampa River State Park

Trails and byways
Continental Divide National Scenic Trail
Fish Creek Falls National Recreation Trail
Flat Tops Trail Scenic Byway
Great Parks Bicycle Route
Swamp Park National Recreation Trail

Demographics

At the 2000 census there were 19,690 people, 7,953 households, and 4,779 families living in the county.  The population density was 8 people per square mile (3/km2).  There were 11,217 housing units at an average density of 5 per square mile (2/km2).  The racial makeup of the county was 96.90% White, 0.13% Black or African American, 0.49% Native American, 0.39% Asian, 0.09% Pacific Islander, 0.73% from other races, and 1.28% from two or more races.  3.22% of the population were Hispanic Latino of any race.
Of the 7,953 households 31.10% had children under the age of 18 living with them, 50.60% were married couples living together, 5.80% had a female householder with no husband present, and 39.90% were non-families. 24.40% of households were one person and 3.70% were one person aged 65 or older.  The average household size was 2.44 and the average family size was 2.92.

The age distribution was 22.60% under the age of 18, 10.10% from 18 to 24, 36.50% from 25 to 44, 25.70% from 45 to 64, and 5.00% 65 or older.  The median age was 35 years. For every 100 females there were 116.60 males.  For every 100 females age 18 and over, there were 119.40 males.

The median household income was $53,612 and the median family income  was $61,927. Males had a median income of $36,997 versus $26,576 for females. The per capita income for the county was $28,792.  About 2.80% of families and 6.10% of the population were below the poverty line, including 5.20% of those under age 18 and 7.70% of those age 65 or over.

Politics
Routt County tilted Republican for much of the second half of the 20th century. From 1952 to 1988, Republicans carried the county in all but one election. The one break in this trend came in 1964, when Lyndon Johnson won Routt by a healthy margin of 63–37.

Since the late 1980s, Routt County has trended Democratic. It swung from a 34-point win for Ronald Reagan in 1984 to only a five-point win for George H. W. Bush in 1988.  In 1992, Bill Clinton became the first Democrat to win the county since 1964 and only the second since 1948, carrying it with modest pluralities in both of his bids. George W. Bush won the county in 2000 by only 264 votes. However, John Kerry won it by a 10-point majority in 2004, and since then Routt has become powerfully Democratic, with Democrats winning by margins rivaling those in the counties closer to Denver. In 2016, Hillary Clinton won the county 54–37. Routt County continued its Democratic trend in 2020, with Joe Biden winning the county 63–35. This is the largest margin of victory for a Democratic presidential candidate in the county since the 1916 election.

Communities

City
Steamboat Springs

Towns
Hayden
Oak Creek
Yampa

Census-designated place
Phippsburg

Other places
Clark
Hahns Peak Village
Toponas
Milner

See also

Outline of Colorado
Index of Colorado-related articles
Colorado counties
Colorado municipalities
National Register of Historic Places listings in Routt County, Colorado

References

External links

Colorado County Evolution by Don Stanwyck
Colorado Historical Society

 

 
Colorado counties
1877 establishments in Colorado
Populated places established in 1877